Antelope Creek is a stream in the U.S. state of South Dakota.

Antelope Creek was after the antelope that were often seen by the stream in the summertime.

See also
List of rivers of South Dakota

References

Rivers of Butte County, South Dakota
Rivers of South Dakota